Poorjangi, Zahedan is a village in Nosratabad Rural District (Sistan and Baluchestan Province), in the Mirjaveh of Zahedan County, Sistan and Baluchestan Province, Iran. At the 2006 census, its population was 46, in 9 families.

References

Populated places in Zahedan County